Foch's tuco-tuco (Ctenomys fochi) is a species of rodent in the family Ctenomyidae. It is endemic to northwestern Argentina, where it is known from southwestern Catamarca Province. The species is named after World War I general Ferdinand Foch.

References

Mammals of Argentina
Tuco-tucos
Endemic fauna of Argentina
Mammals described in 1919
Taxa named by Oldfield Thomas